The national holidays in Palestine

List
 1 January– New Year's Day
 1 May – Labour Day
 Movable– Isra and Mi'raj
 Movable– Eid al-Fitr
 Movable– Eid al-Adha
 Movable– Islamic New Year
 Movable– Mawlid
 15 November– Independence Day
 25 December– Christmas Day

References